Royal Insurance Building may refer to:

 Royal Insurance Building, Liverpool
 Royal Insurance Building, San Francisco